Henri de Vries (8 August 1864 in Rotterdam – 31 January 1949 in Amsterdam), born Hendricus Petrus Lodewicus van Walterop, was a Dutch actor.

Partial filmography
 Cleopatra (1917)
 The Night Hawk (1921)
 The Woman Who Obeyed (1923)
 The World Wants To Be Deceived (1926)
 The Brothers Schellenberg (1926)
 Should We Be Silent? (1926)
 The Convicted (1927)
 The Queen of Spades (1927)
 How Do I Marry the Boss? (1927)
 The Champion of the World (1927)
 Venus in Evening Wear (1927)
 White Cargo (1929)
 The Celestial City (1929)
 Murder at Covent Garden (1932)
 The Scarab Murder Case (1936)
 Strange Experiment (1937)
 Wilton's Zoo (1939)

References

External links

1864 births
1949 deaths
20th-century Dutch male actors
Dutch male film actors
Actors from Rotterdam